Joypurhat is a district in the northern part of Bangladesh, part of the Rajshahi Division.

History

Ancient history

Joypurhat was an area under the Pala Empire & Sena dynasty for a long period of time. Till 16th and 17th centuries, there was no clear information about Joypurhat's history. Previously the local name for Joypurhat was Baghabarihat. Later it was called Gopendraganjahat in many archives. Once Lalbazar Thana was established by containing the present Joypurhat Sadar Upazila and Panchbibi Upazila. The thana was located on the east side of Small Jamuna River named Puranapoil. Then Puranapoil Union was known as Karimnagar. A post office was established in Lalbazar Thana. The sub-registry office was established in Nawabganj. There were many Neelkuthi established in this area. At that era, Lalbazar Thana was a town. Back then it was the only work for the ordinary people of that area. From Lalbazar Thana, Small Jamuna River gorge, the whole travel, commerce, and trade were maintained. 
At that period Lalbazar Thana, Khetlal Upazila & Badalgachhi Upazila were under Dinajpur District. As Dinajpur District, Rangpur District & Rajshahi District were very large, in 1821, a new district was formed from the three districts and named Bogra District. At that time, Bogra District occupied by Adamdighi, Bogra Sadar, Sherpur from Rajshahi District; two upazila from Rangpur District and Khetlal Upazila, Badalgachhi Upazila, Lalbazar Thana from Dinajpur.
Later, on December 16, 1868, Lalbazar Police Thana was moved to Khasbaguri. The local name of Khasbabri was Panchbibi.

In 1884, from Kolkata District to Jalpaiguri District in British Raj the railway line established. Among this railway line, 8 railway station was built in the present Joypurhat District. In that time Baghabari was the local name of Joypurhat and Baghabari railway station was the name of Joypurhat railway station.

After establishing the railway station the people gathered more in the railway area more than in the riverside area of Small Jamuna River. People in the surrounding villages of the railway have increased gradually settled. Gradually the Khajanapur and Lalbazar Hat goes extinct. The name of 'Baghabari railway station' was replaced by the name Joypurhat railway station. And from that, the whole area became known to Joypurhat to all.

Some say that Joypurhat was renamed from the name of Pala Empire King JoyPal who ruled here in his period.

Geography

Rivers

Bangladesh is a country of many rivers. There are mainly five rivers in Joypurhat District. They are:
 Small Jamuna River passes through Joypurhat Sadar Upazila and Panchbibi Upazila.
 Tulshiganga River passes through Joypurhat Sadar Upazila, Khetlal Upazila and Akkelpur Upazila.
 Chiri River passes through Panchbibi Upazila.
 Haraboti River passes through Panchbibi Upazila.
 Sree River passes through Chakbarkat Joypurhat Sadar Upazila.

Climate

Joypurhat is a district of Tropical climate. In winter there is much more rainfall in Joypurhat than in summer. According to The Köppen climate classification, The average annual temperature in here is 25.4 °C and The average annual rainfall is 1738 mm.
The driest month is December with 3 mm. Most precipitation falls in July, with an average of 364 mm. The warmest month of the year is August with an average temperature of 28.9 °C. In January, the average temperature is 18 °C. It is the lowest average temperature of the whole year.

The difference in precipitation between the driest month and the wettest month is 361 mm. The average temperatures vary during the year by 10.9 °C.

Demographics 

According to the 2011 Bangladesh census, Joypurhat District had a population of 913,768, of which 459,284 were males and 454,484 females. Rural population was 769,858 (84.25%) while the urban population was 143,910 (15.75%). Joypurhat district had a literacy rate of 57.48% for the population 7 years and above: 61.39% for males and 53.55% for females.

Muslims make up 89.66% of the population, while Hindus are 8.83% and Christians 0.53% of the population respectively. Other religions (mainly Sarna) are 0.97% of the population. Ethnic minorities were 23,139 (2.53%), mainly Santals.

Economy
Joypurhat's economy is mainly based on seasonal crops like rice, potato, wheat, onion, mango, jackfruit, and banana. It also produces a huge amount of sugarcane and it holds the country's largest sugar mill, Joypurhat Sugar Mill's Limited. There are also a lot of industries, rice mills and poultry farm sin this district. It exports many agricultural products. Hili land port is very close to Joypurhat district, so many people of this district do export-import business by this port and about all the vehicles of this port run over this district. This district is appropriate for all kind of business.

Arts and culture

Joypurhat is a district of rural or rich folk culture. In British Raj period, many festivals such as keerton (কীর্তন), jaree (জারী), palagaan (পালাগান), kabigaan (কবিগান), baul (বাউল), murshidee (মুর্শিদী), lokgeeti (লোকগীতি), bhaoyaiya (ভাওয়াইয়া), and jattra (যাত্রা) were held on various occasions.

After 1971, many cultural organizations established in this district level and upazila level.

Cultural groups 
 AKAVA, Amra Kaj Valobashi, Establish 1982, Executive Director: Mr. Robiul Alom Chowdhury (আমরা কাজ ভালবাসি আকাভা, নির্বাহি পরিচালক, রবিউল আলম চৌধুরী)
 Shopno Chaya Community Center (স্বপ্নছায়া কমিউনিটি সেন্টার)
 Joypurhat Shilpakala Academy (জয়পুরহাট শিল্প কলা একাডেমী)
 Joypurhat Shishu Academy (জয়পুরহাট শিশু একাডেমী)
 Conference of the National Council of Rabindra Sangeet (জাতীয় রবীন্দ্র সঙ্গীত সম্মেলন পরিষদ)
 Baul Cultural Organization (বাউল সাংস্কৃতিক সংগঠন)
 Joypurhat Music Cycle (জয়পুরহাট সঙ্গীত চক্র)
 Saragama Cultural Organization (সারগাম সাংস্কৃতিক সংগঠন)
 Samitma Theatre and Music Schools (শামিত্ম থিয়েটার ও সঙ্গীত বিদ্যালয়)
 Joypurhat Library and Club (জয়পুরহাট লাইব্রেরী এন্ড ক্লাব)
 Joypurhat Theatre (জয়পুরহাট থিয়েটার)
 Drama Circle (ড্রামা সার্কেল) 
 Loko Songskriti Porishod
 Skip It Production
 ABC Group

Points of interest

Jamalganj is situated 10 km south west of Joypurhat. Pahar Pur (Buddhist Bihar), largely known as Sompur Bihar, is situated 6 km(approx)north-west of Jamalganj which is a symbol of past legacy of our knowledge on philosophy, architecture, arts and sculptures. It is UNESCO (United Nations Educational Scientific and Cultural Organization) certified world heritage site.

Jamalganj is known for its long traditional bazar (in English market) fore surrounded places. It is also known for its agricultural products like banana, paddy, rice, wheat, and potato. Also famous for its coal (bituminous) and cement.

Administration

Sub-districts

Joypurhat has five subdistricts (upazilas):

Municipalities

There are five municipalities in Joypurhat District.

Deputy Commissioner (DC): Mohammad Yasin (Bengali- মোহাম্মদ ইয়াছিন)

Mayor: MD Mustafizur Rahaman Mostak (Bengali- মোঃ মুস্তাফিজুর রহমান মোস্তাক)

Parliamentary seats

Joypurhat has two parliament seats: Joypurhat-1 and
Joypurhat-2.

Transport

Roads

Joypurhat is a small district in Rajshahi Division. It has 342.59 km cobbled road, 61.59 km semi-cobbled road and 1569 km raw road.

Railway stations

Joypurhat contains eight railway stations. The total railways of Joypurhat are 38.86 km.

 Joypurhat railway station, Joypurhat Sadar Upazila
 Panchbibi railway station, Panchbibi Upazila
 Jamalganj railway station, Akkelpur Upazila
 Akkelpur railway station, Akkelpur Upazila
 Jafarpur railway station, Akkelpur Upazila
 Tilakpur railway station, Akkelpur Upazila
 Bagjana railway station, Panchbibi Upazila

Joypurhat Railway Station was established in 1884 in the British Raj period. It is a very important railway station in the northern part of Bangladesh.

Education

There are 27 colleges in the district. They include  
Joypurhat Government College, Akkelpur Mujibar Rahman College, Amdai United Degree College, founded 1946, Joypurhat Government Women's College (1972), Joypurhat Womens Degree College,
Kalai Degree College, Khetlal Syeed Altafunnesa College, and Mohipur Haji Mohsin Government College (1969).

Joypurhat Girls' Cadet College, founded in 2006, is a military high school and college for girls.

According to Banglapedia,  R.B. Govt. High School (1946), Haripur High School, founded in 1917, Joypurhat Government Girls' High School (1977), Kalai Moyen Uddin High School (1913), Khanjanpur High School (1901), Khanjanpur Mission Girl's High School (1919), Sonamukhi High School (1916), Teghar High School (1940), and Uchai Jerka S.C. High School (1925) are notable secondary schools.

Religion
The district of Joypurhat has 2573 mosques, 186 mosque-based library, 675 trained Imam, 2200 Imam, 424 temples, 21 churches and 18 Buddhist temples. Hinda - Kasba Shahi Mosque is one such mosque in Joypurhat.

Literature

Joypurhat is a district of ancient civilization and culture organizations. In the time period of old and mid era, Joypurhat contained knowledge ruled and Gauri (গৌরী) literature. Bengali literature poet Jayadeva Goswami (জয়দেব গোস্বামী) is the piece child of Joypurhat.

Notable personalities 

In modern era Joypurhat contains many poets. Among them poet-litterateur:
 Ataur Rahman (আতাউর রহমান)
 Nazrul Criticism Book (নজরুল সমালোচনা)
 Dr. Jahangir Chowdhury(ডঃ জাহাঙ্গীর চৌধুরী) – Modern Koryar Poem (আধুনিক কোরয়ার কবিতা)
 Abbas Ali Khan(আববাছ আলী খান) – Smritir Sagore Dheu (স্মৃতির সাগরে ঢেউ)
 Mohasin Ali Dewan(মহসীন আলী দেওয়ান)
 Sahadat Hossain(সাহাদৎ হোসাইন)
 Mozahar Hossain Jamalee(মোজাহার হোসেন জামালী) – Jeebon Nadir Bake Bake (জীবন নদীর বাঁকে বাঁকে)
 S.M. Ansar Ali(এস এম আনছার আলী) – Je Agun Nive Na (যে আগুন নিভলোনা)
 Playwright MD Alauddin(নাট্যকার মোঃ আলাউদ্দিন)
 Rezaul Karim(রেজাউল করিম) – Porajito Shaliker Anusochona (পরাজিত শালিকের অনুশোচনা)
 Sachindranath Barman(শচীন্দ্রনাথ বর্মন)
 Tahura Begum(তহুরা বেগম)
 Sayed Emdad Ali Dewan(সৈয়দ এমদাদ আলী দেওয়ান)
 Abdus Chattar(আবদুস ছাত্তার)
 Doctor Abu Haidar Sazedur Rahman ( Kuasha, Nayagra etc. )
 Azizul Hauqe Biswas ( Obbacto Dristi )
 Jaton Kumar Devnath ( Schorar Ghora )
 Najrul Isalm ( Jiboner Bornomala )
 Aminul Haque Babul ( Pothe Jete jete )
 Kobita Pervin ( Nisha Bai )
 Shahana Bithi ( Door Subas )
 Mojammel Hossen ( Shuktara )
 Roushon Ara Pervin ( Ghass Foring-er-Beye )
 Abdus Sattar Mridha, akkelpur ( Onuswar Bisorgo Chondrabindu )
 Mohammad Ali Masum ( protarona )
 Playwright Mansurul Aziz (Firiye Dao Oronno,Shongkito Podojatra,Otoshi,Shimultolir ghat-e etc.)

See also
 Districts of Bangladesh
 Rajshahi Division
 R.B. Govt. High School

Notes

References

External links

 

 
Districts of Bangladesh